Portáši is a 1947 Czechoslovak film. The film starred Josef Kemr.

References

External links
 

1947 films
1940s Czech-language films
Czech romantic drama films
Czechoslovak black-and-white films
Czechoslovak romance films
1940s Czech films